Zeekoevlei is a freshwater lake on the Cape Flats in Cape Town, Western Cape Province, South Africa. The name means hippopotamus pond or marsh, with "vlei" being Afrikaans for a shallow minor lake, often seasonal, and zeekoe (literally "sea-cow") being Dutch for hippopotamus. The Afrikaans word for hippopotamus,"seekoei", descends from the Dutch.

Zeekoevlei Nature Reserve (established in June 2000) is based on the lake. It is separated by a peninsula from the Rondevlei Nature Reserve and preserves endangered Cape Lowland Freshwater Wetland ecosystems. 

Zeekoevlei is used for recreational rowing and sailing.

See also

References

 
Lakes of South Africa
Landforms of the Western Cape
Protected areas of the Western Cape